Aethes bomonana is a species of moth of the family Tortricidae. It is found in the United States, where it has been recorded from Florida, Indiana, Louisiana and Ohio.

The forewings are dirty white with ocherous-red and reddish-brown spots. The hindwings are dark purplish grey. Adults have been recorded on wing between February and September.

References

bomonana
Moths described in 1907
Moths of North America